Saeid Safarzadeh (born 21 September 1985 in Tabriz) is an Iranian cyclist, who most recently rode for UCI Continental team .

Major results

2013
 6th Overall Tour de Filipinas
 9th Overall Tour of Iran (Azerbaijan)
2014
 7th Overall Tour de Singkarak
 10th Overall Tour de Ijen
2015
 7th Overall Tour of Iran (Azerbaijan)
1st  Mountains classification
1st Stage 2
2016
 5th Road race, National Road Championships
 6th Overall Tour of Fuzhou
2017
 8th Overall Tour of Iran (Azerbaijan)
1st Stage 3
2018
 1st  Road race, National Road Championships
 Tour of Iran (Azerbaijan)
1st  Mountains classification
1st Stage 5
 1st  Mountains classification Tour of Mevlana
 6th Overall Tour of Mesopotamia
 8th Road race, Asian Games
2019
 National Road Championships
1st  Time trial
2nd Road race
2021
 National Road Championships
1st  Road race
3rd Time trial

References

External links

1985 births
Living people
Iranian male cyclists
Sportspeople from Tabriz
Cyclists at the 2018 Asian Games
Asian Games competitors for Iran
Olympic cyclists of Iran
Cyclists at the 2020 Summer Olympics
21st-century Iranian people